Betula halophila is a species of plant in the Betulaceae family. It is endemic to China.

Betula halophila is a tetraploid, placed in section Betula, subgenus Betula. There are no clear morphological boundaries between it and another three tetraploid species, B. tianshanica, B. microphylla, and B. ovalifolia, or the diploid B. humilis. All grow in open wetlands.

References

Sources
 

Flora of China
halophila
Critically endangered plants
Taxonomy articles created by Polbot
Taxobox binomials not recognized by IUCN